Ramón Beňo (born 5 March 1989 in Nitra), better known by his stage name Rakby, is a Slovak rapper, currently cooperating mainly with fellow Slovak rapper Bacil.

Discography

Studio albums
2007: DEMO NR
2008: Našiel Som Cestu (I Found the way)

Studio albums (solo)
2009: EP Ticho Pred Búrkou (EP Silence before the storm)
2012:  Príbeh ulice 2 (Story of street)

Studio album (with Bacil)
2012: Abnormal

Singles

References

External links
 
 

1989 births
Living people
21st-century Slovak male singers
Slovak rappers
People from Nitra